Ropica albotecta is a species of beetle in the family Cerambycidae. It was described by Breuning in 1961. It is known from Borneo.

References

albotecta
Beetles described in 1961